Soul Blues is an album by the blues musician Lightnin' Hopkins, recorded in 1963 and released on the Bluesville label.

Reception

The Penguin Guide to Blues Recordings wrote: "Soul Blues has a few distinctive pieces like 'I'm Going to Build Me a Heaven of My Own' – not out of atheistic contrariness but in order to give 'lovin' women a happy home'. 'I'm a Crawling Black Snake' which has little in common with Blind Lemon Jefferson's song, is framed by oddly impressionistic guitar". AllMusic reviewer Roundup Newsletter stated: "A true poet of the blues, Lightnin' Hopkins was a master of tall, tongue-in-cheek tales, often made up on the spot in the recording studio".

Track listing
All compositions by Sam "Lightnin'" Hopkins except where noted
 "I'm Going to Build Me a Heaven of My Own" – 5:56
 "My Babe" (Willie Dixon) – 3:20
 "Too Many Drivers" – 3:30
 "I'm a Crawling Black Snake" – 4:50
 "Rocky Mountain Blues" – 3:50
 "I Mean Goodbye" – 3:00
 "The Howling Wolf" – 3:50
 "Black Ghost Blues" – 3:30
 "Darling, Do You Remember Me?" – 3:40
 "Lonesome Graveyard" – 5:30

Personnel

Performance
Lightnin' Hopkins – guitar, vocals
Leonard Gaskin – bass (tracks 1–3, 5–8 & 10)
Herbie Lovelle – drums (tracks 1–3, 5–8 & 10)

Production
 Ozzie Cadena – supervision
 Rudy Van Gelder – engineer

References

Lightnin' Hopkins albums
1965 albums
Prestige Records albums
Albums recorded at Van Gelder Studio
Albums produced by Ozzie Cadena